There were two elections to the United States House of Representatives to serve in the 99th United States Congress.

List of elections 

Elections are listed by date and district.

|-
! 
| Gillis William Long
|  | Democratic
| 1962
|  | Incumbent died January 20, 1985.New member (see Widow's succession) elected March 30, 1985.Democratic hold.
| nowrap | 

|-
! 
| Sam B. Hall
|  | Democratic
| 1976 
|  | Incumbent resigned May 27, 1985 to become a U.S. District Judge.New member elected August 3, 1985.Democratic hold.
| nowrap | 

|}

References 

 
1985